The 1993 Campionati Internazionali di Sicilia was a men's tennis tournament played on outdoor clay courts in Palermo, Italy that was part of the World Series of the 1993 ATP Tour. It was the 15th edition of the tournament and took place from 27 September until 3 October 1993. Second-seeded Thomas Muster won the singles title.

Finals

Singles

 Thomas Muster defeated  Sergi Bruguera 7–6(7–2), 7–5
 It was Muster's 7th singles title of the year and the 20th of his career.

Doubles

 Sergio Casal /  Emilio Sánchez defeated  Juan Garat /  Jorge Lozano 6–3, 6–3

References

External links
 ITF - tournament edition details 

Campionati Internazionali di Sicilia
Campionati Internazionali di Sicilia
Campionati Internazionali di Sicilia